Glendale is an unincorporated community in the town of Gilford in Belknap County, New Hampshire, United States. Glendale is located on the southern shore of Lake Winnipesaukee east of Laconia. Glendale is served by New Hampshire Route 11 and is near Laconia Municipal Airport.

References

Unincorporated communities in Belknap County, New Hampshire
Unincorporated communities in New Hampshire
Populated places on Lake Winnipesaukee